Iain Gordon, FRSE, is a mathematician, currently the Professor of Mathematics and the Head of School of Mathematics at the University of Edinburgh. His field of specialisation is representation theory and noncommutative algebra.

Education and Career 

Gordon studied mathematics as an undergraduate at the University of Bristol (1991–94), took Part III at Magdalene College, the University of Cambridge (1994–95), and completed his PhD on Representations of Quantised Function Algebras at Roots of Unity at the University of Glasgow under the supervision of Ken Brown (1995–1998). He was the Seggie Brown Fellow in Edinburgh (1998–99) and a postdoc at the Bielefeld University, the University of Antwerp and MSRI (1999–2000). He was a lecturer and then reader in the Department of Mathematics at the University of Glasgow (2000–2006), and since then has been the Professor of Mathematics at the University of Edinburgh.

In 2005, Gordon was awarded the Berwick Prize of the London Mathematical Society for his article Baby Verma modules for rational Cherednik algebras. In 2008 he was awarded a 5-year EPSRC Leadership Fellowship to support his research on Rigid Structure in Noncommutative, Geometric and Combinatorial Problems. In 2010 he was elected as a Fellow of the Royal Society of Edinburgh and was an invited speaker at the International Congress of Mathematicians in Hyderabad on Rational Cherednik Algebras. In 2014 he won the Edinburgh University Student Association's Van Heyningen Award for Teaching in Science and Engineering. Since 2018, he has been the Principal Investigator on a 6-year EPSRC Programme Grant with Arend Bayer, Tom Bridgeland, Agata Smoktunowicz and Michael Wemyss on Enhancing Representation Theory, Noncommutative Algebra and Geometry. He was elected as Vice President of the London Mathematical Society in 2019.

He has been Head of School of Mathematics at the University of Edinburgh since 2014.

References 

Year of birth missing (living people)
Living people
21st-century British mathematicians
Professorships at the University of Edinburgh
Alumni of the University of Bristol
Alumni of Magdalene College, Cambridge
Alumni of the University of Glasgow